Burderop Park is a Grade II* listed country manor house near Chiseldon, Wiltshire, England. The house was constructed in the early 17th century to a courtyard design, and was turned into a three-storey square house with bay windows during the 18th century. It is the manor house of the hamlet of Hodson, to the east.

History

The Calley family lived at Burderop for over two centuries; in 1649 William Calley was High Sheriff of Wiltshire and in 1807 Thomas Calley held the title. Thomas was married to Elizabeth Keck, daughter of Anthony James Keck of Stoughton Grange; they had a son John James Calley, who sold the estate to John Parkinson, who held the estate as a trustee for the Duke of Wellington. The estates of Broad Hinton and Salthrop House were also owned by Thomas Calley and his wife, and were sold in 1860 by the second Duke of Wellington to Anthony M. S. Maskelyne of Bassets Down. The estate was for a time known as Okebourne Chace.

World Wars
During World War I and World War II the estate was used as a training camp for the British army and was also the first military camp in Britain to receive American soldiers, who ran the 7505th USA Field Hospital that was stationed at Burderop Park. The Camp had its own railway station and recreational facilities which on one occasion hosted Bob Hope. The 1959 Ordnance Survey map shows Burderop Park still with huts from the war (cell E3).

Post-war
The house was recorded as Grade II* listed in 1955.
Today the house is part of a complex of buildings used for commercialised agricultural landholding and office space for CH2M, and previously for the Halcrow Group.

Interior
The house has oak panelling and plaster ceilings dating from the 17th century, with 18th-century marble fireplaces. There is a painted coat of arms of William Calley dated 1663 over the original fireplace in a first-floor bedroom. Two other rooms have 17th-century paintwork on the walls, including a Jacobean-style panelling design. Part of a newel stair survives in the centre of the north wing, which is thought to be a former stair-turret.

Surroundings 
The north of the estate is Burderop Wood, which was designated a 'Biological Site of Special Scientific Interest' in 1971 for its wet ash-maple and acid pedunculate oak-hazel-ash woodland.

References

Manor houses in England
Country houses in Wiltshire
Grade II* listed buildings in Wiltshire
Grade II* listed houses